

Moho is a genus of extinct birds in the Hawaiian bird family, Mohoidae, that were endemic to the Hawaiian Islands. Members of the genus are known as ōō in the Hawaiian language.  Their plumage was generally striking glossy black; some species had yellowish axillary tufts and other black outer feathers. Most of these species became extinct by habitat loss, the introduction of mammalian predators (like rats, pigs, and mongooses), and by extensive hunting (their plumage was used for the creation of precious aahu alii (robes) and ahu ula (capes) for alii (Hawaiian nobility). The Kauai ōō was the last species of this genus to become extinct, probably a victim of avian malaria.

Until recently, the birds in this genus were thought to belong to the family Meliphagidae (honeyeaters) because they looked and acted so similar to members of that family, including many morphological details. A 2008 study argued, on the basis of a phylogenetic analysis of DNA from museum specimens, that the genera Moho and Chaetoptila do not belong to the Meliphagidae but instead belong to a group that includes the waxwings and the palmchat; they appear especially close to the silky-flycatchers. The authors proposed a family, Mohoidae, for these two extinct genera.

The album O'o by jazz composer John Zorn, released in 2009, is named after these birds.

Taxonomy
The following species belong to this genus (in addition, subfossil remains of a species are known from Maui and known in literature as the Maui ʻōʻō, Moho sp.):

References

Bibliography
Day, David (1981): The Doomsday Book of Animals
Greenway, James C. (1967): Extinct and Vanishing Birds of the World

External links
Short description of the Moho species (French)

 
Naturalis - Hawaii Ōō

 
Bird genera
Holocene extinctions
Endemic fauna of Hawaii
Extinct birds of Hawaii
Bird extinctions since 1500
Taxa named by René Lesson